

Belknap County

Belknap 1
Elects one representative
Republican primary

Democratic primary

General election

Belknap 2
Elects two representatives
Republican primary

Democratic primary

General election

Belknap 3
Elects one representative

Republican primary

Democratic primary

General election

Belknap 4
Elects one representative

Republican primary

Democratic primary

General election

Belknap 5
Elects four representatives

Republican primary

Democratic primary

General election

Belknap 6
Elects four representatives

Republican primary

Democratic primary

General election

Belknap 7
Elects three representatives

Republican primary

Democratic primary

General election

Belknap 8
Elects two representatives

Republican primary

Democratic primary

General election

Carroll County

Carroll 1
Elects three representatives

Democratic primary

Republican primary

Michael DiGregorio won a tiebreaker, advancing to the general election over Mark Hounsell.
General election

Carroll 2
Elects two representatives

Democratic primary

Republican primary

General election

Carroll 3
Elects two representatives

Republican primary

Democratic primary

General election

Carroll 4
Elects two representatives

Republican primary

Democratic primary

General election

Carroll 5
Elects one representative
Republican primary

Democratic primary

General election

Carroll 6
Elects two representatives

Republican primary

Democratic primary

General election

Carroll 7
Elects one representative

Republican primary

Democratic primary

General election

Carroll 8
Elects two representatives

Republican primary

Democratic primary

General election

Cheshire County

Cheshire 1
Elects one representative.
Democratic primary

Republican primary

General election

Cheshire 2
Elects one representative.
Democratic primary

Republican primary

General election

Cheshire 3
Elects one representative.
Democratic primary

Republican primary

General election

Cheshire 4
Elects one representative.
Democratic primary

Republican primary

General election

Cheshire 5
Elects one representative.
Democratic primary

Republican primary

General election

Cheshire 6
Elects two representatives.
Democratic primary

Republican primary

General election

Cheshire 7
Elects one representative.
Democratic primary

Republican primary

General election

Cheshire 8
Elects one representative.
Democratic primary

No Republican candidates filed to run in the district.
General election

Cheshire 9
Elects one representative.
Democratic primary

Republican primary

General election

Cheshire 10
Elects two representatives.
Democratic primary

Republican primary

General election

Cheshire 11
Elects one representative.
Republican primary

Democratic primary

General election

Cheshire 12
Elects one representative.
Democratic primary

Republican primary

General election

Cheshire 13
Elects one representative.
Democratic primary

Republican primary

General election

Cheshire 14
Elects one representative.
Republican primary

Democratic primary

General election

Cheshire 15
Elects two representatives.
Democratic primary

Republican primary

General election

Cheshire 16
Elects one representative.
Democratic primary

Republican primary

General election

Cheshire 17
Elects one representative.
Republican primary

Democratic primary

General election

Cheshire 18
Elects two representatives.
Republican primary

Democratic primary

General election

Coös County

Coös 1
Elects two representatives.
Republican primary

Democratic primary

General election

Coös 2
Elects one representative.
Republican primary

Democratic primary

General election

Coös 3
Elects one representative.
Republican primary

No other candidates filed to run in the district
General election

Coös 4
Elects one representative.
Republican primary

Democratic primary

General election

Coös 5
Elects two representatives.
Republican primary

Democratic primary

General election

Coös 6
Elects one representative
Democratic primary

Republican primary

General election

Coös 7
Elects one representative.
Democratic primary

Republican primary

General election

Greer initially led the count on election night by four votes, but a recount put Kelley in the lead by two.

Grafton County

Grafton 1
Elects three representatives.
Democratic primary

Republican primary

General election

Grafton 2
Elects one representative
Democratic primary

Republican primary

General election

Grafton 3
Elects one representative.
Republican primary

Democratic primary

General election

Grafton 4
Elects one representative.
Republican primary

Democratic primary

General election

Grafton 5
Elects two representatives.
Republican primary

No other candidates filed to run in the district.
General election

Grafton 6
Elects one representative.
Republican primary

Democratic primary

General election

Grafton 7
Elects one representative.
Republican primary

Democratic primary

General election

Grafton 8
Elects three representatives.
Democratic primary

Republican primary

General election

Grafton 9
Elects one representative.
Republican primary

Democratic primary

General election

Grafton 10
Elects one representative.
Republican primary

Democratic primary

General election

Grafton 11
Elects one representative.
Republican primary

Democratic primary

General election

Grafton 12
Elects four representatives.
Democratic primary

No other candidates filed to run in the district.
General election

Grafton 13
Elects one representative.
Democratic primary

No other candidates filed to run in the district.
General election

Grafton 14
Elects one representative.
Democratic primary

No other candidates filed to run in the district.
General election

Grafton 15
Elects one representative.
Democratic primary

General election

Grafton 16
Elects one representative.
Democratic primary

No other candidates filed to run in the district.
General election

Grafton 17
Elects one representative.
Democratic primary

No other candidates filed to run in the district.
General election

Grafton 18
Elects one representative.
Republican primary

Democratic primary

General election

Hillsborough County

Hillsborough 1
Elects four representatives.
Republican primary

Democratic primary

Hillsborough 2
Elects seven representatives.
Republican primary

Democratic primary

Hillsborough 3
Elects three representatives.
Democratic primary

Republican primary

Hillsborough 4
Elects three representatives.
Democratic primary

Republican primary

Hillsborough 5
Elects three representatives.
Democratic primary

Republican primary

Hillsborough 6
Elects three representatives.
Democratic primary

Republican primary

Hillsborough 7
Elects three representatives
Democratic primary

Republican primary

Hillsborough 8
Elects three representatives
Democratic primary

Republican primary

Hillsborough 9
Elects three representatives
Democratic primary

Republican primary

Hillsborough 10
Elects three representatives
Democratic primary

Republican primary

Hillsborough 11
Elects three representatives
Democratic primary

Republican primary

Merrimack County

Rockingham County

Strafford County

Sullivan County

References

External links
 

2022 New Hampshire elections
New Hampshire House
New Hampshire House of Representatives elections